Admiral Grant may refer to:

Albert W. Grant (1856–1930), U.S. Navy admiral
Harold Taylor Wood Grant (1899–1965), Royal Canadian Navy vice admiral
John Grant (Royal Navy officer) (1908–1996), British Royal Navy rear admiral
Percy Grant (Royal Navy officer) (1867–1952), British Royal Navy admiral
William Lowther Grant (1864–1929), British Royal Navy admiral